Borniopsis tsurumaru is a species of bivalve in the family Lasaeidae.  

The scientific name of this species was first published by Habe in 1959.

References

 Okutani T., ed. (2000) Marine mollusks in Japan. Tokai University Press. 1173 pp.
 Huber M. (2015). Compendium of Bivalves 2. Harxheim: ConchBooks. 907 pp

Lasaeidae
Bivalves described in 1959